{| class="wikitable sortable" style="text-align:center"
!Draft
! Pick
!Picked by
! Player
! Nationality
|-
|1973
|17
|Milwaukee Bucks
|Swen Nater
|
|-
|1981
|61
|Portland Trail Blazers
|Petur Gudmundsson
|
|-
|1981
|171
|Golden State Warriors
|Yasutaka Okayama
|
|-
|1983
|15
|Denver Nuggets
|Howard Carter
|
|-
|1983
|17
|Philadelphia 76ers
|Leo Rautins
|
|-
|1983
|24
|Cleveland Cavaliers
|Stewart Granger
|
|-
|1983
|75
|Chicago Bulls
|Ron Crevier
|
|-
|1983
|207
|Indiana Pacers
|Mark Smed
|
|-
|1984
|1
|Houston Rockets
|Hakeem Olajuwon
|
|-
|1984
|29
|Indiana Pacers
|Stuart Gray
|
|-
|1984
|43
|Chicago Bulls
|Gregory Wiltjer
|
|-
|1984
|63
|New Jersey Nets
|Yommy Sangodeyi
|
|-
|1984
|106
|Seattle SuperSonics
|Eli Pasquale
|
|-
|1984
|131
|New Jersey Nets
|Oscar Schmidt
|
|-
|1984
|161
|Los Angeles Lakers
|Richard Haenisch
|
|-
|1985
|1
|New York Knicks
|Patrick Ewing
|
|-
|1985
|8
|Dallas Mavericks
|Detlef Schrempf
|
|-
|1985
|16
|Dallas Mavericks
|Bill Wennington
|
|-
|1985
|17
|Dallas Mavericks
|Uwe Blab
|
|-
|1985
|31
|Washington Bullets
|Manute Bol
|
|-
|1985
|36
|New Jersey Nets
|Yvon Joseph
|
|-
|1985
|38
|New Jersey Nets
|Fernando Martín
|
|-
|1985
|52
|Los Angeles Clippers
|Anicet Lavodrama
|
|-
|1985
|62
|New Jersey Nets
|Nigel Miguel
|
|-
|1985
|101
|Cleveland Cavaliers
|Gunther Behnke
|
|-
|1985
|115
|Los Angeles Lakers
|Timo Saarelainen
|
|-
|1985
|126
|Chicago Bulls
|Dan Meagher
|
|-
|1985
|148
|Phoenix Suns
|Georgi Glouchkov
|
|-
|1986
|24
|Portland Trail Blazers
|Arvydas Sabonis
|
|-
|1986
|37
|Portland Trail Blazers
|Panagiotis Fasoulas
|
|-
|1986
|40
|Atlanta Hawks
|Augusto Binelli
|
|-
|1986
|60
|Portland Trail Blazers
|Dražen Petrović
|
|-
|1986
|82
|Washington Bullets
|Barry Mungar
|
|-
|1986
|134
|Atlanta Hawks
|Alexander Volkov
|
|-
|1986
|157
|Atlanta Hawks
|Valeri Tikhonenko
|
|-
|1987
|8
|Chicago Bulls
|Olden Polynice
|
|-
|1987
|15
|Utah Jazz
|José Ortiz
|
|-
|1987
|16
|Philadelphia 76ers
|Chris Welp
|
|-
|1987
|36
|Washington Bullets
|Duane Washington
|
|-
|1987
|43
|Philadelphia 76ers
|Andrew Kennedy
|
|-
|1987
|51
|Sacramento Kings
|Sven Myer
|
|-
|1987
|57
|Philadelphia 76ers
|Hansi Gnad
|
|-
|1987
|67
|Atlanta Hawks
|Song Tao
|
|-
|1987
|90
|Atlanta Hawks
|Fanis Christodoulou
|
|-
|1987
|113
|Atlanta Hawks
|José Antonio Montero
|
|-
|1987
|127
|Golden State Warriors
|Šarūnas Marčiulionis
|
|-
|1987
|136
|Atlanta Hawks
|Riccardo Morandou
|
|-
|1987
|159
|Atlanta Hawks
|Franjo Arapović
|
|-
|1987
|161
|Los Angeles Lakers
|Ron Vanderschaaf
|
|-
|1988
|2
|Indiana Pacers
|Rik Smits
|
|-
|1988
|9
|Miami Heat
|Rony Seikaly
|
|-
|1988
|26
|Portland Trail Blazers
|Rolando Ferreira
|
|-
|1988
|39
|Milwaukee Bucks
|Tito Horford
|
|-
|1988
|49
|Dallas Mavericks
|José Vargas
|
|-
|1988
|54
|Atlanta Hawks
|Jorge González
|
|-
|1988
|57
|Philadelphia 76ers
|Hernán Montenegro
|
|-
|1988
|67
|Utah Jazz
|Ricky Grace
|
|-
|1989
|26
|Los Angeles Lakers
|Vlade Divac
|
|-
|1989
|40
|Boston Celtics
|Dino Rađa
|
|-
|1990
|25
|Portland Trail Blazers
|Alaa Abdelnaby
|
|-
|1990
|29
|Chicago Bulls
|Toni Kukoč
|
|-
|1990
|30
|Miami Heat
|Carl Herrera
|
|-
|1990
|50
|Phoenix Suns
|Miloš Babić
|
|-
|1990
|52
|Cleveland Cavaliers
|Stefano Rusconi
|
|-
|1991
|4
|Denver Nuggets
|Dikembe Mutombo
|
|-
|1991
|7
|Minnesota Timberwolves
|Luc Longley
|
|-
|1991
|24
|Boston Celtics
|Rick Fox
|
|-
|1991
|44
|Philadelphia 76ers
|Álvaro Teherán
|
|-
|1991
|51
|Houston Rockets
|Žan Tabak
|
|-
|1992
|43
|Golden State Warriors
|Predrag Danilović
|
|-
|1992
|49
|Phoenix Suns
|Ron Ellis
|
|-
|1993
|26
|Orlando Magic
|Geert Hammink
|
|-
|1993
|30
|Washington Bullets
|Gheorghe Mureșan
|
|-
|1993
|34
|Golden State Warriors
|Darnell Mee
|
|-
|1993
|46
|Houston Rockets
|Richard Petruška
|
|-
|1993
|50
|Houston Rockets
|Marcelo Nicola
|
|-
|1993
|51
|Indiana Pacers
|Spencer Dunkley
|
|-
|1994
|14
|New Jersey Nets
|Yinka Dare
|
|-
|1994
|36
|Boston Celtics
|Andrei Fetisov
|
|-
|1994
|41
|Indiana Pacers
|William Njoku
|
|-
|1994
|50
|Phoenix Suns
|Charles Claxton
|
|-
|1994
|54
|Seattle SuperSonics
|Željko Rebrača
|
|-
|1995
|22
|Charlotte Hornets
|George Zidek
|
|-
|1995
|31
|Chicago Bulls
|Dragan Tarlać
|
|-
|1995
|51
|Sacramento Kings
|Dejan Bodiroga
|
|-
|1995
|53
|Los Angeles Clippers
|Constantin Popa
|
|-
|1995
|54
|Seattle SuperSonics
|Eurelijus Žukauskas
|
|-
|1996
|12
|Cleveland Cavaliers
|Vitaly Potapenko
|
|-
|1996
|14
|Sacramento Kings
|Peja Stojaković
|
|-
|1996
|15
|Phoenix Suns
|Steve Nash
|
|-
|1996
|20
|Cleveland Cavaliers
|Zydrunas Ilgauskas
|
|-
|1996
|23
|Denver Nuggets
|Efthimios Rentzias
|
|-
|1996
|25
|Utah Jazz
|Martin Müürsepp
|
|-
|1996
|36
|Los Angeles Clippers
|Doron Sheffer
|
|-
|1996
|53
|Milwaukee Bucks
|Jeff Nordgaard
|
|-
|1997
|1
|San Antonio Spurs
|Tim Duncan
|
|-
|1997
|8
|Golden State Warriors
|Adonal Foyle
|
|-
|1997
|11
|Sacramento Kings
|Tariq Abdul-Wahad
|
|-
|1997
|18
|Portland Trail Blazers
|Chris Anstey
|
|-
|1997
|29
|Houston Rockets
|Serge Zwikker
|
|-
|1997
|33
|Philadelphia 76ers
|Marko Milič
|
|-
|1997
|48
|Washington Bullets
|Predrag Drobnjak
|
|-
|1997
|49
|Atlanta Hawks
|Alain Digbeu
|
|-
|1997
|52
|Vancouver Grizzlies
|C. J. Bruton
|
|-
|1997
|53
|Los Angeles Lakers
|Paul Rogers
|
|-
|1997
|55
|Boston Celtics
|Ben Pepper
|
|-
|1997
|57
|Chicago Bulls
|Roberto Dueñas
|
|-
|1998
|1
|Los Angeles Clippers
|Michael Olowokandi
|
|-
|1998
|9
|Milwaukee Bucks
|Dirk Nowitzki
|
|-
|1998
|17
|Minnesota Timberwolves
|Radoslav Nesterović
|
|-
|1998
|18
|Houston Rockets
|Mirsad Türkcan
|
|-
|1998
|24
|San Antonio Spurs
|Felipe López
|
|-
|1998
|27
|Seattle SuperSonics
|Vladimir Stepania
| Georgia
|-
|1998
|35
|Dallas Mavericks
|Bruno Šundov
|
|-
|1998
|44
|New York Knicks
|Sean Marks
|
|-
|1998
|50
|Charlotte Hornets
|Andrew Betts
|
|-
|1999
|12
|Toronto Raptors
|Aleksandar Radojević
|
|-
|1999
|15
|New York Knicks
|Frédéric Weis
|
|-
|1999
|17
|Atlanta Hawks
|Cal Bowdler
|
|-
|1999
|24
|Utah Jazz
|Andrei Kirilenko
|
|-
|1999
|36
|Dallas Mavericks
|Wang Zhizhi
|
|-
|1999
|37
|Washington Wizards
|Obinna Ekezie
|
|-
|1999
|40
|Dallas Mavericks
|Gordan Giriček
|
|-
|1999
|41
|Denver Nuggets
|Francisco Elson
|
|-
|1999
|47
|Philadelphia 76ers
|Todd MacCulloch
|
|-
|1999
|57
|San Antonio Spurs
|Manu Ginóbili
|
|-
|2000
|11
|Boston Celtics
|Jérôme Moïso
|
|-
|2000
|16
|Sacramento Kings
|Hedo Türkoğlu
|
|-
|2000
|19
|Charlotte Hornets
|Jamaal Magloire
|
|-
|2000
|24
|Chicago Bulls
|Dalibor Bagarić
|
|-
|2000
|25
|Phoenix Suns
|Jake Tsakalidis
|
|-
|2000
|26
|Denver Nuggets
|Mamadou N'Diaye
|
|-
|2000
|27
|Indiana Pacers
|Primož Brezec
|
|-
|2000
|30
|Los Angeles Clippers
|Marko Jarić
|
|-
|2000
|36
|New Jersey Nets
|Soumaila Samake
|
|-
|2000
|38
|Houston Rockets
|Eduardo Nájera
|
|-
|2000
|40
|Atlanta Hawks
|Hanno Möttölä
|
|-
|2000
|42
|Seattle SuperSonics
|Olumide Oyedeji
|
|-
|2000
|47
|Seattle SuperSonics
|Josip Sesar
|
|-
|2000
|51
|Minnesota Timberwolves
|Igor Rakočević
|
|-
|2001
|3
|Atlanta Hawks
|Pau Gasol
|
|-
|2001
|8
|Cleveland Cavaliers
|DeSagana Diop
|
|-
|2001
|12
|Seattle SuperSonics
|Vladimir Radmanović
|
|-
|2001
|24
|Utah Jazz
|Raül López
|
|-
|2001
|26
|Philadelphia 76ers
|Samuel Dalembert
|
|-
|2001
|28
|San Antonio Spurs
|Tony Parker
|
|-
|2001
|32
|Orlando Magic
|Omar Cook
|
|-
|2001
|38
|Detroit Pistons
|Mehmet Okur
|
|-
|2001
|47
|Denver Nuggets
|Ousmane Cisse
|
|-
|2001
|48
|Vancouver Grizzlies
|Antonis Fotsis
|
|-
|2001
|50
|Portland Trail Blazers
|Ruben Boumtje-Boumtje
|
|-
|2001
|56
|San Antonio Spurs
|Robertas Javtokas
|
|-
|2001
|57
|Philadelphia 76ers
|Alvin Jones
|
|-
|2002
|1
|Houston Rockets
|Yao Ming
|
|-
|2002
|5
|Denver Nuggets
|Nikoloz Tskitishvili
|
|-
|2002
|7
|New York Knicks
|Nenê
|
|-
|2002
|15
|Houston Rockets
|Boštjan Nachbar
|
|-
|2002
|16
|Philadelphia 76ers
|Jiří Welsch
|
|-
|2002
|24
|New Jersey Nets
|Nenad Krstić
|
|-
|2002
|32
|Memphis Grizzlies
|Robert Archibald
|
|-
|2002
|34
|Milwaukee Bucks
|Dan Gadzuric
|
|-
|2002
|36
|New York Knicks
|Miloš Vujanić
|
|-
|2002
|37
|Atlanta Hawks
|David Andersen
|
|-
|2002
|40
|Washington Wizards
|Juan Carlos Navarro
|
|-
|2002
|41
|Los Angeles Clippers
|Mario Kasun
|
|-
|2002
|49
|Seattle SuperSonics
|Peter Fehse
|
|-
|2002
|50
|Boston Celtics
|Darius Songaila
|
|-
|2002
|51
|Portland Trail Blazers
|Federico Kammerichs
|
|-
|2002
|55
|Dallas Mavericks
|Mladen Šekularac
|
|-
|2002
|56
|San Antonio Spurs
|Luis Scola
|
|-
|2002
|58
|Sacramento Kings
|Randy Holcomb
|
|-
|2003
|2
|Detroit Pistons
|Darko Miličić
|
|-
|2003
|6
|Los Angeles Clippers
|Chris Kaman
|
|-
|2003
|10
|Washington Wizards
|Jarvis Hayes
|
|-
|2003
|11
|Golden State Warriors
|Mickaël Piétrus
|
|-
|2003
|17
|Phoenix Suns
|Žarko Čabarkapa
|
|-
|2003
|19
|Utah Jazz
|Aleksandar Pavlović
|
|-
|2003
|21
|Atlanta Hawks
|Boris Diaw
|
|-
|2003
|22
|New Jersey Nets
|Zoran Planinić
|
|-
|2003
|25
|Detroit Pistons
|Carlos Delfino
|
|-
|2003
|26
|Minnesota Timberwolves
|Ndudi Ebi
|
|-
|2003
|28
|San Antonio Spurs
|Leandro Barbosa
|
|-
|2003
|30
|New York Knicks
|Maciej Lampe
|
|-
|2003
|34
|Los Angeles Clippers
|Sofoklis Schortsanitis
|
|-
|2003
|35
|Milwaukee Bucks
|Szymon Szewczyk
|
|-
|2003
|39
|New York Knicks
|Slavko Vraneš
|
|-
|2003
|42
|Orlando Magic
|Zaza Pachulia
|
|-
|2003
|44
|Houston Rockets
|Malick Badiane
|
|-
|2003
|46
|Denver Nuggets
|Sani Bečirovič
|
|-
|2003
|50
|Philadelphia 76ers
|Paccelis Morlende
|
|-
|2003
|52
|Toronto Raptors
|Remon van de Hare
|
|-
|2003
|54
|Portland Trail Blazers
|Nedžad Sinanović
|
|-
|2003
|57
|Dallas Mavericks
|Xue Yuyang
|
|-
|2003
|58
|Detroit Pistons
|Andreas Glyniadakis
|
|-
|2004
|3
|Chicago Bulls
|Ben Gordon
|
|-
|2004
|7
|Phoenix Suns
|Luol Deng
|
|-
|2004
|8
|Toronto Raptors
|Rafael Araújo
|
|-
|2004
|11
|Golden State Warriors
|Andris Biedriņš
|
|-
|2004
|21
|Utah Jazz
|Pavel Podkolzin
|
|-
|2004
|22
|New Jersey Nets
|Victor Khryapa
|
|-
|2004
|23
|Portland Trail Blazers
|Sergei Monia
|
|-
|2004
|27
|Los Angeles Lakers
|Sasha Vujačić
|
|-
|2004
|28
|San Antonio Spurs
|Beno Udrih
|
|-
|2004
|30
|Orlando Magic
|Anderson Varejão
|
|-
|2004
|31
|Chicago Bulls
|Jackson Vroman
|
|-
|2004
|32
|Washington Wizards
|Peter John Ramos
|
|-
|2004
|34
|Atlanta Hawks
|Donta Smith
|
|-
|2004
|39
|Toronto Raptors
|Albert Miralles
|
|-
|2004
|42
|Atlanta Hawks
|Viktor Sanikidze
|
|-
|2004
|46
|Portland Trail Blazers
|Ha Seung-jin
|
|-
|2004
|47
|Miami Heat
|Pape Sow
|
|-
|2004
|49
|Memphis Grizzlies
|Serhiy Lishchuk
|
|-
|2004
|50
|Dallas Mavericks
|Vassilis Spanoulis
|
|-
|2004
|51
|New Jersey Nets
|Christian Drejer
|
|-
|2004
|52
|San Antonio Spurs
|Romain Sato
|
|-
|2004
|53
|Miami Heat
|Matt Freije
|
|-
|2004
|55
|Houston Rockets
|Luis Flores
|
|-
|2004
|56
|Los Angeles Lakers
|Marcus Douthit
|
|-
|2004
|57
|San Antonio Spurs
|Sergei Karaulov
|
|-
|2005
|1
|Milwaukee Bucks
|Andrew Bogut
|
|-
|2005
|7
|Toronto Raptors
|Charlie Villanueva
|
|-
|2005
|9
|Golden State Warriors
|Ike Diogu
|
|-
|2005
|11
|Orlando Magic
|Fran Vázquez
|
|-
|2005
|12
|Los Angeles Clippers
|Yaroslav Korolev
|
|-
|2005
|20
|Denver Nuggets
|Julius Hodge
|
|-
|2005
|23
|Sacramento Kings
|Francisco García
|
|-
|2005
|25
|Seattle SuperSonics
|Johan Petro
|
|-
|2005
|27
|Portland Trail Blazers
|Linas Kleiza
|
|-
|2005
|28
|San Antonio Spurs
|Ian Mahinmi
|
|-
|2005
|35
|Portland Trail Blazers
|Ricky Sánchez
|
|-
|2005
|36
|Milwaukee Bucks
|Ersan İlyasova
|
|-
|2005
|37
|Los Angeles Lakers
|Ronny Turiaf
|
|-
|2005
|38
|Orlando Magic
|Travis Diener
|
|-
|2005
|41
|Toronto Raptors
|Roko Ukić
|
|-
|2005
|43
|New Jersey Nets
|Mile Ilić
|
|-
|2005
|44
|Orlando Magic
|Martynas Andriuškevičius
|
|-
|2005
|46
|Indiana Pacers
|Erazem Lorbek
|
|-
|2005
|49
|Washington Wizards
|Andray Blatche
|
|-
|2005
|52
|Denver Nuggets
|Axel Hervelle
|
|-
|2005
|57
|Phoenix Suns
|Marcin Gortat
|
|-
|2005
|58
|Toronto Raptors
|Uroš Slokar
|
|-
|2005
|59
|Atlanta Hawks
|Cenk Akyol
|
|-
|2006
|1
|Toronto Raptors
|Andrea Bargnani
|
|-
|2006
|10
|Seattle SuperSonics
|Mouhamed Sene
|
|-
|2006
|13
|Philadelphia 76ers
|Thabo Sefolosha
|
|-
|2006
|18
|Washington Wizards
|Oleksiy Pecherov
|
|-
|2006
|19
|Sacramento Kings
|Quincy Douby
|
|-
|2006
|20
|New York Knicks
|Renaldo Balkman
|
|-
|2006
|27
|Phoenix Suns
|Sergio Rodríguez
|
|-
|2006
|30
|Portland Trail Blazers
|Joel Freeland
|
|-
|2006
|38
|Golden State Warriors
|Kosta Perović
|
|-
|2006
|40
|Seattle SuperSonics
|Denham Brown
|
|-
|2006
|43
|New Orleans/Oklahoma City Hornets
|Marcus Vinicius
|
|-
|2006
|44
|Orlando Magic
|Lior Eliyahu
|
|-
|2006
|48
|Washington Wizards
|Vladimir Veremeenko
|
|-
|2006
|51
|Los Angeles Lakers
|Cheikh Samb
|
|-
|2006
|52
|Los Angeles Clippers
|Guillermo Diaz
|
|-
|2006
|53
|Seattle SuperSonics
|Yotam Halperin
|
|-
|2006
|55
|Cleveland Cavaliers
|Ejike Ugboaja
|
|-
|2006
|56
|Toronto Raptors
|Edin Bavčić
|
|-
|2006
|57
|Minnesota Timberwolves
|Loukas Mavrokefalidis
|
|-
|2006
|59
|San Antonio Spurs
|Damir Markota
|
|-
|2007
|3
|Atlanta Hawks
|Al Horford
|
|-
|2007
|6
|Milwaukee Bucks
|Yi Jianlian
|
|-
|2007
|9
|Chicago Bulls
|Joakim Noah
|
|-
|2007
|18
|Golden State Warriors
|Marco Belinelli
|
|-
|2007
|24
|Phoenix Suns
|Rudy Fernández
|
|-
|2007
|28
|San Antonio Spurs
|Tiago Splitter
|
|-
|2007
|30
|Philadelphia 76ers
|Petteri Koponen
|
|-
|2007
|38
|Philadelphia 76ers
|Kyrylo Fesenko
|
|-
|2007
|39
|Miami Heat
|Stanko Barać
|
|-
|2007
|40
|Los Angeles Lakers
|Sun Yue
|
|-
|2007
|46
|Golden State Warriors
|Stéphane Lasme
|
|-
|2007
|48
|Los Angeles Lakers
|Marc Gasol
|
|-
|2007
|50
|Dallas Mavericks
|Renaldas Seibutis
|
|-
|2007
|52
|Portland Trail Blazers
|Taurean Green
|
|-
|2007
|54
|Houston Rockets
|Brad Newley
|
|-
|2007
|57
|Detroit Pistons
|Sammy Mejía
|
|-
|2007
|58
|San Antonio Spurs
|Georgios Printezis
|
|-
|2007
|60
|Dallas Mavericks
|Milovan Raković
|
|-
|2008
|6
|New York Knicks
|Danilo Gallinari
|
|-
|2008
|17
|Toronto Raptors
|Roy Hibbert
|
|-
|2008
|20
|Charlotte Bobcats
|Alexis Ajinça
|
|-
|2008
|23
|Utah Jazz
|Kosta Koufos
|
|-
|2008
|24
|Seattle SuperSonics
|Serge Ibaka
|
|-
|2008
|25
|Houston Rockets
|Nicolas Batum
|
|-
|2008
|31
|Minnesota Timberwolves
|Nikola Peković
|
|-
|2008
|36
|Portland Trail Blazers
|Ömer Aşık
|
|-
|2008
|37
|Milwaukee Bucks
|Luc Mbah a Moute
|
|-
|2008
|41
|Indiana Pacers
|Nathan Jawai
|
|-
|2008
|43
|Sacramento Kings
|Patrick Ewing Jr.
|
|-
|2008
|44
|Utah Jazz
|Ante Tomić
|
|-
|2008
|45
|San Antonio Spurs
|Goran Dragić
|
|-
|2008
|53
|Utah Jazz
|Tadija Dragićević
|
|-
|2008
|56
|Seattle SuperSonics
|Sasha Kaun
|
|-
|2008
|60
|Boston Celtics
|Semih Erden
|
|-
|2009
|2
|Memphis Grizzlies
|Hasheem Thabeet
|
|-
|2009
|5
|Minnesota Timberwolves
|Ricky Rubio
|
|-
|2009
|22
|Portland Trail Blazers
|Víctor Claver
|
|-
|2009
|23
|Sacramento Kings
|Omri Casspi
|
|-
|2009
|24
|Dallas Mavericks
|Byron Mullens
|
|-
|2009
|25
|Oklahoma City Thunder
|Rodrigue Beaubois
|
|-
|2009
|30
|Cleveland Cavaliers
|Christian Eyenga
|
|-
|2009
|34
|Denver Nuggets
|Sergio Llull
|
|-
|2009
|39
|Detroit Pistons
|Jonas Jerebko
|
|-
|2009
|45
|Minnesota Timberwolves
|Nick Calathes
|
|-
|2009
|47
|Minnesota Timberwolves
|Henk Norel
|
|-
|2009
|49
|Atlanta Hawks
|Sergiy Gladyr
|
|-
|2009
|50
|Utah Jazz
|Goran Suton
|
|-
|2009
|53
|San Antonio Spurs
|Nando de Colo
|
|-
|2009
|55
|Portland Trail Blazers
|Patty Mills
|
|-
|2009
|57
|Phoenix Suns
|Emir Preldžić
|
|-
|2009
|59
|Los Angeles Lakers
|Chinemelu Elonu
|
|-
|2010
|8
|Los Angeles Clippers
|Al-Farouq Aminu
|
|-
|2010
|17
|Chicago Bulls
|Kevin Séraphin
|
|-
|2010
|28
|Memphis Grizzlies
|Greivis Vásquez
|
|-
|2010
|31
|New Jersey Nets
|Tibor Pleiß
|
|-
|2010
|35
|Washington Wizards
|Nemanja Bjelica
|
|-
|2010
|38
|New York Knicks
|Andy Rautins
|
|-
|2010
|44
|Milwaukee Bucks
|Jerome Jordan
|
|-
|2010
|45
|Minnesota Timberwolves
|Paulão Prestes
|
|-
|2010
|46
|Phoenix Suns
|Gani Lawal
|
|-
|2010
|49
|San Antonio Spurs
|Ryan Richards
|
|-
|2010
|50
|Dallas Mavericks
|Solomon Alabi
|
|-
|2010
|51
|Oklahoma City Thunder
|Magnum Rolle
|
|-
|2010
|53
|Atlanta Hawks
|Pape Sy
|
|-
|2010
|56
|Minnesota Timberwolves
|Hamady N'Diaye
|
|-
|2011
|3
|Utah Jazz
|Enes Kanter
|
|-
|2011
|4
|Cleveland Cavaliers
|Tristan Thompson
|
|-
|2011
|5
|Toronto Raptors
|Jonas Valančiūnas
|
|-
|2011
|6
|Washington Wizards
|Jan Veselý
|
|-
|2011
|7
|Sacramento Kings
|Bismack Biyombo
|
|-
|2011
|16
|Philadelphia 76ers
|Nikola Vučević
|
|-
|2011
|20
|Minnesota Timberwolves
|Donatas Motiejūnas
|
|-
|2011
|23
|Houston Rockets
|Nikola Mirotić
|
|-
|2011
|29
|San Antonio Spurs
|Cory Joseph
|
|-
|2011
|31
|Miami Heat
|Bojan Bogdanović
|
|-
|2011
|42
|Indiana Pacers
|Dāvis Bertāns
|
|-
|2011
|54
|Cleveland Cavaliers
|Milan Mačvan
|
|-
|2011
|56
|Los Angeles Lakers
|Chukwudiebere Maduabum
|
|-
|2011
|57
|Dallas Mavericks
|Tanguy Ngombo
|
|-
|2011
|58
|Los Angeles Lakers
|Ater Majok
|
|-
|2011
|59
|San Antonio Spurs
|Ádám Hanga
|
|-
|2012
|15
|Philadelphia 76ers
|Maurice Harkless
|
|-
|2012
|19
|Orlando Magic
|Andrew Nicholson
|
|-
|2012
|20
|Denver Nuggets
|Evan Fournier
|
|-
|2012
|22
|Boston Celtics
|Fab Melo
|
|-
|2012
|30
|Golden State Warriors
|Festus Ezeli
|
|-
|2012
|31
|Charlotte Bobcats
|Jeffery Taylor
|
|-
|2012
|32
|Washington Wizards
|Tomáš Satoranský
|
|-
|2012
|48
|New York Knicks
|Kostas Papanikolaou
|
|-
|2012
|50
|Denver Nuggets
|İzzet Türkyılmaz
|
|-
|2012
|51
|Boston Celtics
|Kris Joseph
|
|-
|2012
|52
|Golden State Warriors
|Ognjen Kuzmić
|
|-
|2012
|53
|Los Angeles Clippers
|Furkan Aldemir
|
|-
|2012
|54
|Philadelphia 76ers
|Tornike Shengelia
|
|-
|2012
|56
|Toronto Raptors
|Tomislav Zubčić
|
|-
|2012
|57
|Brooklyn Nets
|İlkan Karaman
|
|-
|2012
|60
|Los Angeles Lakers
|Robert Sacre
|
|-
|2013
|1
|Cleveland Cavaliers
|Anthony Bennett
|
|-
|2013
|5
|Phoenix Suns
|Alex Len
|
|-
|2013
|12
|Oklahoma City Thunder
|Steven Adams
|
|-
|2013
|13
|Dallas Mavericks
|Kelly Olynyk
|
|-
|2013
|15
|Milwaukee Bucks
|Giannis Antetokounmpo
|
|-
|2013
|16
|Boston Celtics
|Lucas Nogueira
|
|-
|2013
|17
|Atlanta Hawks
|Dennis Schröder
|
|-
|2013
|19
|Cleveland Cavaliers
|Sergey Karasev
|
|-
|2013
|21
|Utah Jazz
|Gorgui Dieng
|
|-
|2013
|27
|Denver Nuggets
|Rudy Gobert
|
|-
|2013
|28
|San Antonio Spurs
|Livio Jean-Charles
|
|-
|2013
|30
|Phoenix Suns
|Nemanja Nedović
|
|-
|2013
|32
|Oklahoma City Thunder
|Álex Abrines
|
|-
|2013
|45
|Portland Trail Blazers
|Marko Todorović
|
|-
|2013
|47
|Atlanta Hawks
|Raul Neto
|
|-
|2013
|49
|Chicago Bulls
|Erik Murphy
|
|-
|2013
|54
|Washington Wizards
|Arsalan Kazemi
|
|-
|2013
|55
|Memphis Grizzlies
|Joffrey Lauvergne
|
|-
|2013
|59
|Minnesota Timberwolves
|Bojan Dubljević
|
|-
|2013
|60
|Memphis Grizzlies
|Jānis Timma
|
|-
|2014
|1
|Minnesota Timberwolves
|Andrew Wiggins
|
|-
|2014
|3
|Philadelphia 76ers
|Joel Embiid
|
|-
|2014
|5
|Utah Jazz
|Dante Exum
|
|-
|2014
|8
|Sacramento Kings
|Nik Stauskas
|
|-
|2014
|12
|Orlando Magic
|Dario Šarić
|
|-
|2014
|16
|Chicago Bulls
|Jusuf Nurkić
|
|-
|2014
|18
|Phoenix Suns
|Tyler Ennis
|
|-
|2014
|20
|Toronto Raptors
|Bruno Caboclo
|
|-
|2014
|25
|Houston Rockets
|Clint Capela
|
|-
|2014
|27
|Phoenix Suns
|Bogdan Bogdanović
|
|-
|2014
|31
|Milwaukee Bucks
|Damien Inglis
|
|-
|2014
|41
|Denver Nuggets
|Nikola Jokić
|
|-
|2014
|43
|Atlanta Hawks
|Walter Tavares
|
|-
|2014
|45
|Charlotte Hornets
|Dwight Powell
|
|-
|2014
|49
|Chicago Bulls
|Cameron Bairstow
|
|-
|2014
|51
|New York Knicks
|Thanasis Antetokounmpo
|
|-
|2014
|52
|Philadelphia 76ers
|Vasilije Micić
|
|-
|2014
|53
|Minnesota Timberwolves
|Alessandro Gentile
|
|-
|2014
|54
|Philadelphia 76ers
|Nemanja Dangubić
|
|-
|2014
|57
|Indiana Pacers
|Louis Labeyrie
|
|-
|2015
|1
|Minnesota Timberwolves
|Karl-Anthony Towns
|
|-
|2015
|4
|New York Knicks
|Kristaps Porziņģis
|
|-
|2015
|5
|Orlando Magic
|Mario Hezonja
|
|-
|2015
|7
|Denver Nuggets
|Emmanuel Mudiay
|
|-
|2015
|12
|Utah Jazz
|Trey Lyles
|
|-
|2015
|26
|San Antonio Spurs
|Nikola Milutinov
|
|-
|2015
|31
|Minnesota Timberwolves
|Cedi Osman
|
|-
|2015
|35
|Philadelphia 76ers
|Willy Hernangómez
|
|-
|2015
|39
|Charlotte Hornets
|Juan Pablo Vaulet
|
|-
|2015
|42
|Utah Jazz
|Olivier Hanlan
|
|-
|2015
|47
|Philadelphia 76ers
|Artūras Gudaitis
|
|-
|2015
|50
|Atlanta Hawks
|Marcus Eriksson
|
|-
|2015
|52
|Dallas Mavericks
|Satnam Singh Bhamara
|
|-
|2015
|55
|San Antonio Spurs
|Cady Lalanne
|
|-
|2015
|57
|Denver Nuggets
|Nikola Radičević
|
|-
|2015
|59
|Atlanta Hawks
|Dimitrios Agravanis
|
|-
|2015
|60
|Philadelphia 76ers
|Luka Mitrović
|
|-
|2016
|1
|Philadelphia 76ers
|Ben Simmons
|
|-
|2016
|4
|Phoenix Suns
|Dragan Bender
|
|-
|2016
|6
|New Orleans Pelicans
|Buddy Hield
|
|-
|2016
|7
|Denver Nuggets
|Jamal Murray
|
|-
|2016
|9
|Toronto Raptors
|Jakob Pöltl
|
|-
|2016
|10
|Milwaukee Bucks
|Thon Maker
|
|-
|2016
|11
|Orlando Magic
|Domantas Sabonis
|
|-
|2016
|13
|Phoenix Suns
|Georgios Papagiannis
|
|-
|2016
|15
|Denver Nuggets
|Juan Hernangómez
|
|-
|2016
|16
|Boston Celtics
|Guerschon Yabusele
|
|-
|2016
|23
|Boston Celtics
|Ante Žižić
|
|-
|2016
|24
|Philadelphia 76ers
|Timothé Luwawu-Cabarrot
|
|-
|2016
|26
|Philadelphia 76ers
|Furkan Korkmaz
|
|-
|2016
|27
|Toronto Raptors
|Pascal Siakam
|
|-
|2016
|28
|Phoenix Suns
|Skal Labissière
|
|-
|2016
|32
|Los Angeles Lakers
|Ivica Zubac
|
|-
|2016
|33
|Los Angeles Clippers
|Cheick Diallo
|
|-
|2016
|35
|Boston Celtics
|Rade Zagorac
|
|-
|2016
|39
|New Orleans Pelicans
|David Michineau
|
|-
|2016
|43
|Houston Rockets
|Zhou Qi
|
|-
|2016
|44
|Atlanta Hawks
|Isaia Cordinier
|
|-
|2016
|48
|Chicago Bulls
|Paul Zipser
|
|-
|2016
|49
|Detroit Pistons
|Michael Gbinije
|
|-
|2016
|51
|Boston Celtics
|Ben Bentil
|
|-
|2016
|52
|Utah Jazz
|Joel Bolomboy
|
|-
|2016
|53
|Denver Nuggets
|Petr Cornelie
|
|-
|2016
|57
|Memphis Grizzlies
|Wang Zhelin
|
|-
|2016
|58
|Boston Celtics
|Abdel Nader
|
|-
|2017
|7
|Minnesota Timberwolves
|Lauri Markkanen
|
|-
|2017
|8
|New York Knicks
|Frank Ntilikina
|
|-
|2017
|18
|Indiana Pacers
|T. J. Leaf
|
|-
|2017
|25
|Orlando Magic
|Anžejs Pasečņiks
|
|-
|2017
|36
|Philadelphia 76ers
|Jonah Bolden
|
|-
|2017
|41
|Atlanta Hawks
|Tyler Dorsey
|
|-
|2017
|43
|Houston Rockets
|Isaiah Hartenstein
|
|-
|2017
|45
|Houston Rockets
|Dillon Brooks
|
|-
|2017
|49
|Denver Nuggets
|Vlatko Čančar
|
|-
|2017
|50
|Philadelphia 76ers
|Mathias Lessort
|
|-
|2017
|57
|Brooklyn Nets
|Aleksandar Vezenkov
|
|-
|2017
|58
|New York Knicks
|Ognjen Jaramaz
|
|-
|2017
|60
|Atlanta Hawks
|Alpha Kaba
|  
|-
|2018
|1
|Phoenix Suns
|Deandre Ayton
|  
|-
|2018
|3
|Atlanta Hawks
|Luka Dončić
|  
|-
|2018
|11
|Charlotte Hornets
|Shai Gilgeous-Alexander
|  
|-
|2018
|20
|Minnesota Timberwolves
|Josh Okogie
|  
|-
|2018
|25
|Los Angeles Lakers
|Moritz Wagner
|  
|-
|2018
|29
|Brooklyn Nets
|Džanan Musa
|  
|-
|2018
|31
|Phoenix Suns
|Élie Okobo
|  
|-
|2018
|39
|Philadelphia 76ers
|Isaac Bonga
|  
|-
|2018
|40
|Brooklyn Nets
|Rodions Kurucs
|  
|-
|2018
|43
|Denver Nuggets
|Justin Jackson
|  
|-
|2018
|44
|Washington Wizards
|Issuf Sanon
|  
|-
|2018
|47
|Los Angeles Lakers
|Sviatoslav Mykhailiuk
|  
|-
|2018
|55
|Charlotte Hornets
|Arnoldas Kulboka
|  
|-
|2018
|60
|Philadelphia 76ers
|Kostas Antetokounmpo
|  
|-
|2019
|3
|New York Knicks
|RJ Barrett
|  
|-
|2019
|9
|Washington Wizards
|Rui Hachimura
|  
|-
|2019
|15
|Detroit Pistons
|Sekou Doumbouya
|  
|-
|2019
|17
|Brooklyn Nets
|Nickeil Alexander-Walker
|  
|-
|2019
|18
|Indiana Pacers
|Goga Bitadze
|  
|-
|2019
|19
|San Antonio Spurs
|Luka Šamanić
|  
|-
|2019
|21
|Oklahoma City Thunder
|Brandon Clarke
|  
|-
|2019
|27
|Brooklyn Nets
|Mfiondu Kabengele
|  
|-
|2019
|34
|Philadelphia 76ers
|Bruno Fernando
|  
|-
|2019
|35
|Atlanta Hawks
|Marcos Louzada Silva
|  
|-
|2019
|37
|Dallas Mavericks
|Deividas Sirvydis
|  
|-
|2019
|39
|New Orleans Pelicans
|Alen Smailagić
|  
|-
|2019
|44
|Miami Heat
|Bol Bol
|  
|-
|2019
|47
|Sacramento Kings
|Ignas Brazdeikis
|  
|-
|2019
|54
|Philadelphia 76ers
|Marial Shayok
|  
|-
|2019
|60
|Sacramento Kings
|Vanja Marinković
|  
|-
|2020
|7
|Detroit Pistons
|Killian Hayes
| 
|-
|2020
|9
|Washington Wizards
|Deni Avdija
| 
|-
|2020
|17
|Minnesota Timberwolves
|Aleksej Pokuševski
| 
|-
|2020
|18
|Dallas Mavericks
|Josh Green
| 
|-
|2020
|20
|Miami Heat
|Precious Achiuwa
| 
|-
|2020
|23
|New York Knicks
|Leandro Bolmaro
| 
|-
|2020
|27
|Utah Jazz
|Udoka Azubuike
| 
|-
|2020
|34
|Philadelphia 76ers
|Theo Maledon
| 
|-
|2020
|37
|Washington Wizards
|Vít Krejčí
| 
|-
|2020
|42
|New Orleans Pelicans
|Nick Richards
| 
|-
|2020
|44
|Chicago Bulls
|Marko Simonović
| 
|-
|2020
|47
|Boston Celtics
|Yam Madar
| 
|-
|2020
|48
|Golden State Warriors
|Nico Mannion
| 
|-
|2021
|6
|Oklahoma City Thunder
|Josh Giddey
| 
|-
|2021
|7
|Golden State Warriors
|Jonathan Kuminga
| 
|-
|2021
|8
|Orlando Magic
|Franz Wagner
| 
|-
|2021
|12
|San Antonio Spurs
|Joshua Primo
| 
|-
|2021
|13
|Indiana Pacers
|Chris Duarte
| 
|-
|2021
|16
|Oklahoma City Thunder
|Alperen Şengün
| 
|-
|2021
|19
|New York Knicks
|Kai Jones
| 
|-
|2021
|23
|Houston Rockets
|Usman Garuba
| 
|-
|2021
|30
|Utah Jazz
|Santi Aldama
| 
|-
|2021
|34
|Oklahoma City Thunder
|Rokas Jokubaitis
| 
|-
|2021
|39
|Sacramento Kings
|Neemias Queta
| 
|-
|2021
|45
|Boston Celtics
|Juhann Begarin
| 
|-
|2021
|46
|Toronto Raptors
|Dalano Banton
| 
|-
|2021
|51
|Philadelphia 76ers
|Filip Petrusev
| 
|-
|2021
|53
|Philadelphia 76ers
|Charles Bassey
| 
|-
|2021
|54
|Indiana Pacers
|Sandro Mamukelashvili
| 
|-
|2021
|57
|Charlotte Hornets
|Balsa Koprivica
| 
|-
|2021
|60
|Indiana Pacers
|Georgios Kalaitzakis
| 
|-
|2022
|1
|Orlando Magic
|Paolo Banchero
| 
|-
|2022
|6
|Indiana Pacers
|Bennedict Mathurin
| 
|-
|2022
|7
|Portland Trail Blazers
|Shaedon Sharpe
| 
|-
|2022
|8
|New Orleans Pelicans
|Dyson Daniels
| 
|-
|2022
|9
|San Antonio Spurs
|Jeremy Sochan
| 
|-
|2022
|11
|New York Knicks
|Ousmane Dieng
| 
|-
|2022
|27
|Miami Heat
|Nikola Jović
| 
|-
|2022
|31
|Indiana Pacers
|Andrew Nembhard
| 
|-
|2022
|32
|Orlando Magic
|Caleb Houstan
| 
|-
|2022
|33
|Toronto Raptors
|Christian Koloko
| 
|-
|2022
|36
|Portland Trail Blazers
|Gabriele Procida
| 
|-
|2022
|39
|Cleveland Cavaliers
|Khalifa Diop
| 
|-
|2022
|43
|Los Angeles Clippers
|Moussa Diabaté
| 
|-
|2022
|45
|Charlotte Hornets
|Josh Minott
| 
|-
|2022
|46
|Detroit Pistons
|Ismaël Kamagate
| 
|-
|2022
|50
|Minnesota Timberwolves
|Matteo Spagnolo
| 
|-
|2022
|52
|New Orleans Pelicans
|Karlo Matković
| 
|-
|2022
|54
|Washington Wizards
|Yannick Nzosa
| 
|-
|2022
|55
|Golden State Warriors
|Gui Santos
| 
|-
|2022
|56
|Cleveland Cavaliers
|Luke Travers
| 
|-
|2022
|58
|Indiana Pacers
|Hugo Besson
| 

National Basketball Association draft
National Basketball Association lists